Raúl Inostroza Donoso (10 September 1921 – 1975) was a Chilean long-distance runner. He competed in the marathon at the 1952 Summer Olympics.

References

1921 births
1975 deaths
Athletes (track and field) at the 1951 Pan American Games
Athletes (track and field) at the 1952 Summer Olympics
Chilean male long-distance runners
Chilean male marathon runners
Olympic athletes of Chile
Place of birth missing
Pan American Games competitors for Chile
20th-century Chilean people